Salma El Tayeb (also transliterated Eltayeb (born 24 March 2004 in Cairo) is an Egyptian professional squash player. As of October 2021, she was ranked number 80 in the world.

References

2004 births
Living people
Egyptian female squash players
21st-century Egyptian women